The black-crested Sumatran langur (Presbytis melalophos) is a species of primate in the family Cercopithecidae. It is endemic to Sumatra in Indonesia. Its natural habitat is subtropical or tropical dry forests. It is threatened by habitat loss.

The black Sumatran langur, black-and-white langur, Sarawak surili, Raffles' banded langur and mitered langur were formerly considered a subspecies of P. melalophos.

References

External links
ARKive - images and information on Mitred leaf monkey (Presbytis melalophos) 

Presbytis
Endemic fauna of Sumatra
Primates of Indonesia
Endangered fauna of Asia
Mammals described in 1821
Taxonomy articles created by Polbot
Taxa named by Thomas Stamford Raffles